Henry Fowle Durant (February 22, 1822 – October 3, 1881) was an American lawyer and philanthropist, as well as the co-founder, with his wife, Pauline Durant, of Wellesley Female Seminary, which became Wellesley College.

Early life and career
Durant was born in Hanover, New Hampshire as Henry Wells Smith. He changed his name to Henry Fowle Durant to avoid confusion with a local businessman.

He completed his studies in Harvard Law School at Harvard University in 1841. He subsequently practiced in Boston.

Durant married his cousin, Pauline Adeline Durant (née Fowle), in 1855. The couple went on to have two children, Henry “Harry” Fowle Durant and Pauline Cazenove Durant. Both children died in early childhood.

After the death of his son, Harry, Durant underwent a religious conversion and became a lay preacher in Massachusetts and New Hampshire, practicing from 1864 to 1875.

In 1870, Henry and Pauline Durant contributed between one and two million dollars to found Wellesley Female Seminary, in Wellesley, Massachusetts. Durant, a staunch believer in female education, famously said, “Women can do the work. I give them the chance.”

Henry Durant died from Bright's Disease at the age of 59.

References

American evangelists
Harvard Law School alumni
Massachusetts lawyers
Wellesley College people
1822 births
1881 deaths
People from Hanover, New Hampshire
People from Wellesley, Massachusetts
19th-century American philanthropists
19th-century American lawyers